Graecophalangium is a genus of harvestmen in the family Phalangiidae.

Species
 Graecophalangium atticum Roewer, 1923
 Graecophalangium cretaeum Martens, 1966
 Graecophalangium drenskii P. Mitvov, 1995
 Graecophalangium militare (C.L.Koch, 1839)
 Graecophalangium punicum Starega, 1973
 Graecophalangium anatolicum (Dr. Kemal Kurt, 2022)

References

Harvestmen
Harvestman genera